The Chrysler Cordoba was first introduced as a full-sized luxury car based on the Chrysler Newport that was marketed during the 1970 model year. 

The nameplate was then applied to a intermediate-sized two-door personal luxury car starting with the 1975 model year. The Cordoba was manufactured by Chrysler in North America over two generations until the 1983 model year. 

The personal luxury version was the company's first model produced specifically for that market segment and the first Chrysler-branded vehicle that was smaller than full-size. 

The name was taken from the Spanish city of Córdoba, Spain.

Background

In the early 1960s, when other upmarket brands were expanding into smaller cars with such models as the Mercury Comet and Buick Skylark, Chrysler very publicly declared that there would "never" be a smaller Chrysler. The 1963 Chrysler deluxe catalog says of the New Yorker, "This is no jr. edition car." The 1962 deluxe catalog goes even further, proclaiming on the rear cover: "there's not a jr. edition in the whole family!".

1970 Newport Cordoba

The Chrysler Newport Cordoba name was introduced in the spring of 1970 as a specially trimmed individual model based on the Chrysler Newport available in either two-door or four-door hardtop body designs. This full-size model was a "limited edition luxury car, designed to introduce you to Chrysler" and consisted of an exclusive "Cordoba Gold" paint with matching wheels, wheel covers, and grille fascia, the side molding had textured vinyl inserts, an "Espanol" vinyl roof featured a special pattern, and the hood ornament included an "Aztec" eagle. The Aztec motif continued into the interior with textured antique gold vinyl seats and door panels as well as special dash and glovebox appliqué. Chrysler marketing described these as a "quiet Spanish motif". Included in the   base price were the   two-barrel carburetor V8 engine and the special gold vinyl roof as well as the exterior and interior Axtec trim. Adding an automatic transmission, power steering, H78x15 fiberglass-belted whitewall tires, and a "golden tone" AM radio raised the price to $4,241.65.

Development

The 1974 Cordoba was originally designed by Chrysler to be the all-new Plymouth Sebring for 1975, which was to share bodies with the Dodge Charger SE. Instead, a decision was made to position the model as a personal luxury car and introduce it as the first small Chrysler. The Cordoba was available with smaller, more economical engines than other Chryslers, and rode on a  wheelbase,  less than its next largest sibling. This single body style coupe was one of Chrysler's few genuine hits of the 1970s. At a time when the automaker was teetering on bankruptcy, demand for Cordobas exceeded supply for its first years, with the production of over 150,000 units for the inaugural 1975 models, and the highest number built in 1977, with 183,000 units. Half of the Chrysler division production during this period (and occasionally more) was composed of Cordobas, and they helped to revive the division. All Cordobas were built in Windsor, Ontario.

Although Córdoba is the name of a city in Spain, which it was intended to evoke. The car's emblem was actually a stylized version of the Argentine cordoba coin and there is a Córdoba Province, Argentina. That theme was carried out with somewhat baroque trim inside the vehicle. The first spokesperson for the car was Richard Basehart; however, Chrysler secured movie and television actor Ricardo Montalbán as the car's advertising spokesman through its entire run. Notable was his eloquent praise of its "rich Corinthian leather" interior.

Chrysler had previously sought to evoke a Spanish exotic flair in their products when they introduced the 1929 DeSoto Six with model names of "cupe", "coche" and "de Lujo", or Spanish for "coupe", "coach", and "deluxe", while the roadster was called the "Roadster Espanol".

First generation (1975–1979)

The Cordoba was introduced by Chrysler for the 1975 model year as an upscale personal luxury car, competing with the Oldsmobile Cutlass, Buick Regal, and Mercury Cougar. The Cordoba was originally intended to be marketed under the Plymouth marque. Model names Mirada, Premier, Sebring, and Grand Era were associated during the development project. All except Grand Era would be used on later Chrysler, Dodge, and Eagle vehicles, though only the Dodge Mirada would be related to the Cordoba. However, losses from the newly introduced full-size C-body models due to the 1973 oil crisis encouraged Chrysler executives to seek higher profits by marketing the model under the more upscale Chrysler brand. 

The car was a success, with over 150,000 units sold in 1975, a sales year that was otherwise dismal for the company. Gauges, except the tachometer, were standard. For the 1976 model year, sales increased slightly to 165,000. The mildly revised 1977 version also sold well, with just under 140,000 cars. The success of using the Chrysler nameplate strategy is contrasted to the far fewer sales of its similar and somewhat cheaper corporate cousin, the Dodge Charger SE.

Interiors were more luxurious than the Dodge Charger SE and much more than the top-line standard intermediates (Plymouth Fury, Dodge Coronet) with a velour cloth notchback bench seat and folding armrest standard. Optionally available were bucket seats upholstered in Corinthian leather with a center armrest and cushion, or at extra cost, a center console with floor shifter and storage compartment. The dashboard and door panels featured simulated burled elm trim and metal stampings in 1975, while the 1976 through 1979 models featured simulated rosewood trim. A 60/40 bench seat was introduced in 1976 and other seating/upholstery options were added each year through 1979.  The first-generation, B-body Cordoba was very opulent for the price.

The original design endured only small changes for three years before a variety of factors contributed to a decline in sales. For 1978, there was a modest restyling with the then-popular rectangular headlights in a stacked configuration (the Dodge Charger SE kept its round headlamps for 1978 rather than the rectangular stacked design of the Cordoba). A Chrysler designer, Jeffrey Godshall, wrote in Collectible Automobile magazine that this restyling was viewed as "somewhat tacky" and eliminated much of the visual appeal that 1975 through 1977 Cordobas had been known for. The restyle also made the car appear heavier than the predecessor versions at a time when other cars in this class were being downsized to smaller dimensions such as the Ford Thunderbird in 1977 as well as the Chevrolet Monte Carlo and Pontiac Grand Prix in 1978.

The Cordoba's sales decline in 1978 and 1979 could also be attributed to the introduction of the smaller Chrysler LeBaron in mid-1977 that was available in both sedan and coupe models and offered similar personal-luxury styling and options. At the same time, Chrysler's financial position and quality reputation were in steady decline.

For 1979 a $2,040 "300" option package was offered on the Cordoba, featuring an all-white exterior, "Chrysler 300"-style grille, and a four-barrel 360 V-8 engine. The Chrysler 300 was advertised and marketed as its own model, not as a "Cordoba 300."

Second generation (1980–1983)

The Cordoba was downsized for the 1980 model year. The smaller, second-generation model used the J-platform dating to the 1976 F-body Plymouth Volaré, along with its rebadged variant, the Dodge Mirada. Chrysler also revived the Imperial for 1981 as a third variant of the J-platform.

The Cordoba and Mirada featured a standard six-cylinder engine (the 225 Slant Six) that, while very reliable, did not seem to be suitable power (95 hp) for these slightly upmarket coupes. The much-detuned  130 hp V8 was an option (standard on the Imperial, with EFI), as was the performance-oriented code E58  185 hp V8, though it would be dropped off the options list for 1981 and on.

The 1980 and 1981 LS model (which was originally intended to be the "300") featured an aerodynamic-appearing nosecone (nearly identical to that on the Mirada) with a "crosshair" grille. Other features of this model were the deletion of the vinyl roof cover and a monotone color exterior.

The second-generation Cordoba sales were down substantially. The U.S. automobile industry's downsizing of vehicles also affected personal luxury models. Both the Chevrolet Monte Carlo in 1978 and the 1980 Ford Thunderbird shrank in size. 

With changes in the marketplace, Chrysler increasingly concentrated on its compact, front wheel drive models with four and six-cylinder engines. The Cordoba was discontinued in 1983.

Production Figures

Powertrains
With fewer than 100 cars equipped with the E58   V8, the engine option was discontinued after the 1980 model year due to low demand. Only two engines were available with the Slant-6 being standard and the  V8 optional for the 1981 through 1983 model years.

NASCAR
Both the first- and second-generation Cordobas appeared in NASCAR. Ed Negre campaigned on occasion during the 1978 and 1979 seasons and Buddy Arrington ran a second-generation car in the 1982 through 1984 seasons, alternating with Dodge Miradas and Chrysler Imperials. The Cordoba was no more aerodynamic than the other Mopars. The owner/driver never won a race, but was "able to collect 26 top 10s and $334,000 in career earnings."

Collectibility
There are examples of Chrysler Cordobas available for collectors. However, the cars were not viewed as valuable or worth saving after the 1990s with good examples going to the scrap yards. There is not much aftermarket support for these vehicles so collectors may encounter challenges if a full restoration is needed.

Regarding the 300 version, Consumer Guide described in 2007 that "the '79 could become a minor collectible in the distant future, but LS prospects seem slim to non-existent at this time."

References

External links

 
 

Cordoba
Luxury vehicles
Mid-size cars
Rear-wheel-drive vehicles
Coupés
1980s cars
Cars introduced in 1975
Personal luxury cars